Massi Vivo–Conecta is a Paraguayan UCI Continental cycling team founded in 2015 as an amateur team. The following year, the team was granted a UCI Continental licence.

Team roster

Major results
2016
 Stage 2 Volta Ciclistica Internacional do Rio Grande do Sul, Daniel Juarez

References

External links

UCI Continental Teams (America)
2015 establishments in Paraguay
Cycling teams based in Paraguay
Cycling teams established in 2015